The Emanuel County Courthouse in Swainsboro, Georgia serves Emanuel County.  The current building is the county's eighth courthouse.

Former courthouse

The former courthouse in Swainsboro, built in 1940 and since demolished, and a sheriff department building, were listed on the National Register of Historic Places in 1995 as Emanuel County Courthouse and Sheriff Department. The Sheriff Department building, built in 1912, is a one-story Classical Revival building with a pedimented entrance portico. It was designed by Augusta, Georgia, architect L.F. Goodrich.

The courthouse served as Emanuel County's seventh justice building, replacing the 1920 courthouse that was destroyed in a 1938 fire. It was designed in Stripped Classical style by architects Dennis and Dennis. The courthouse was demolished in 2002, but a historical marker remains.

References

Stripped Classical architecture in the United States
National Register of Historic Places in Emanuel County, Georgia
Government buildings completed in 1912
Government buildings completed in 1938
Buildings and structures in Emanuel County, Georgia
County courthouses in Georgia (U.S. state)
Demolished buildings and structures in Georgia (U.S. state)